The 2002 Palmer Cup was held on 11–12 July 2002 at Doonbeg Golf Club in  County Clare, Ireland. The United States won –.

Format
On Thursday, there were four matches of four-ball in the morning, followed by four foursomes matches in the afternoon. Eight singles matches were played on the Friday morning with a further eight more in the afternoon.. In all, 24 matches were played.

Each of the 24 matches was worth one point in the larger team competition. If a match was all square after the 18th hole, each side earned half a point toward their team total. The team that accumulated at least  points won the competition.

Teams
Eight college golfers from the Great Britain and Ireland and the United States participated in the event.

Thursday's matches

Morning four-ball

Afternoon foursomes

Friday's matches

Morning singles

Afternoon singles

Michael Carter award
The Michael Carter Award was inaugurated in 2002. On 13 February 2002, former Penn State University golfer Michael Carter died in an automobile accident at the age of 19. "The Michael Carter "Junior" Memorial Award is presented to the Arnold Palmer Cup participant from each team who best represents the qualities and ideals that made this young man unique."

The first winners were Justin Walters.and Bill Haas.

References

External links
Palmer Cup official site

Arnold Palmer Cup
Golf tournaments in the Republic of Ireland
Golf in County Dublin
Sport in County Clare
Palmer Cup
Palmer Cup
Palmer Cup
Golf in Munster